The Icaleptidae are a small family of neotropical harvestmen within the suborder Laniatores. Although only two species have been described, many more are probably to be discovered.

Name
The name of the type genus is combined from Ica, a Chibchan people inhabiting the slopes of Sierra Nevada de Santa Marta, and the second half of the genus Gonyleptes (Gonyleptidae), the first described harvestman in Laniatores.

Description
The two described species have their fourth pair of legs ventrally inserted, giving them a flea-like habitus.

Distribution
Although Icaleptidae have until now only been described from Ecuador (Cotopaxi) and northern Colombia (Sierra Nevada de Santa Marta), they are expected to occur in Venezuela. Both species were found in leaf litter. The type material of the two species was collected in 1968 (I. malkini) and 1993 (Z. platnicki).

Relationships
This new family is closely related to Zalmoxidae and Fissiphalliidae. Some species that now reside in other families, such as Phalangodinella (Zalmoxidae) share similarities with the species in Icaleptidae. It is possible that several species now in other families will be transferred here.

Species

 Icaleptes Kury & Pérez, 2002
 Icaleptes malkini Kury & Pérez, 2002

 Zalmopsylla Kury & Pérez, 2002
 Zalmopsylla platnicki Kury & Pérez, 2002

Footnotes

References
 Joel Hallan's Biology Catalog: Icaleptidae
  (2002): A new family of Laniatores from northwestern South America (Arachnida, Opiliones). Revista Ibérica de Aracnología 6: 3-11. PDF
  (eds.) (2007): Harvestmen - The Biology of Opiliones. Harvard University Press 

Harvestman families